The 2002 OFC Women's Under 19 Qualifying Tournament was the inaugural edition of what would later be known as the OFC U-20 Women's Championship, a biennial international football competition for women's under-20 national teams organised by Oceania Football Confederation. It was hosted by Tonga from 23 April–3 May 2002.

Players born on or after 1 January 1983 were eligible to participate in the competition.

In the final, Australia defeated New Zealand 6–0.

By winning the tournament, Australia also qualified for the 2002 FIFA U-19 Women's World Championship, the inaugural FIFA U-20 Women's World Cup, in Canada.

Qualification
All members of the Oceania Football Confederation qualified automatically, however, Papua New Guinea and Vanuatu withdrew before the tournament began.

Participating teams
The following teams participated in the 2006 OFC U-20 Women's Championship tournament:

Group stage

Group A

Group B

Knockout stage
In the knockout stage, extra time and penalty shoot-out were used to decide the winner if necessary.

Bracket

Semi-finals

Third-place match

Final

Top goalscorers
10 goals
  Amber Hearn

9 goals
  Selin Kuralay

6 goals

  Sara Clapham
  Priscilla Duncan

5 goals

  Catherine Cannuli
  Hayley Crawford
  Emma Davison

References

External links
 Oceania Football Confederation official website

2002
2002 in women's association football
2002 Ofc U-19 Women's Qualifying Tournament
2001–02 in OFC football
2002 in youth association football